The 74th Infantry Division (74-ya Pekhotnaya Diviziya) was an infantry formation of the Russian Imperial Army.

Organization
1st Brigade
293rd Infantry Regiment
294th Infantry Regiment
2nd Brigade
295th Infantry Regiment
296th Infantry Regiment

References

Infantry divisions of the Russian Empire